Argyrotaenia cubae is a species of moth of the family Tortricidae. It is found in Cuba.

The wingspan is about 19 mm. The ground colour of the forewings is cream ferruginous, cream along the edges of the markings and tinged with yellowish brown terminally where weak refractive markings occur. The markings are brownish with dark brown edges. The hindwings are cream, tinged with brownish and browner on the peripheries.

Etymology
The species name refers to the country where the type locality is located.

References

C
Endemic fauna of Cuba
Moths of Cuba
Moths described in 2010